Elachista ictera is a moth of the family Elachistidae. It was described by Lauri Kaila in 2011. It is found in Australia in the Australian Capital Territory and south-eastern New South Wales.

The wingspan is 7.9-8.1 mm for males. The forewings are ochreous yellow. The hindwings are pale grey.

References

Moths described in 2011
ictera
Moths of Australia